Gloria Grahame Hallward (November 28, 1923 – October 5, 1981) was an American actress and singer. She began her acting career in theatre, and in 1944 made her first film for MGM.

Despite a featured role in It's a Wonderful Life (1946), MGM did not believe she had the potential for major success, and sold her contract to RKO Studios. Often cast in film noir projects, Grahame was nominated for an Academy Award for Best Supporting Actress for Crossfire (1947), and later won the award for her work in The Bad and the Beautiful (1952). After starring opposite Humphrey Bogart in In A Lonely Place (1950), she achieved her highest profile with Sudden Fear (1952), The Big Heat (1953), Human Desire (1954), and Oklahoma! (1955), but her film career began to wane soon afterwards.

Grahame returned to work on the stage, but continued to appear in films and television productions, usually in supporting roles.

In 1974, she was diagnosed with breast cancer. It went into remission less than a year later and Grahame returned to work. In 1980, the cancer returned, but Grahame refused to accept the diagnosis or seek treatment. Choosing instead to continue working, she traveled to the United Kingdom to appear in a play. Her health, however, declined rapidly. She returned to New York City, where she died in October 1981, aged 57.

Early life
Grahame was born in Los Angeles. She was raised a Methodist. Her English father, Reginald Michael Bloxam Hallward (known as Michael Hallward) was an architect and author; her Scottish mother, Jeanne McDougall, who used the stage name Jean Grahame, was a British stage actress and acting teacher. The couple had an elder daughter, Joy Hallward, an actress who married John Mitchum (the younger brother of actor Robert Mitchum). During Gloria's childhood and adolescence, her mother taught her acting. Grahame attended Hollywood High School before dropping out to pursue acting.

Career
An early stage appearance was in the long-running farce Good Night, Ladies at Chicago's Blackstone Theatre, starring Buddy Ebsen, which opened on April 12, 1942.
 

Grahame made her Broadway debut on December 6, 1943 at the Royale Theatre as Florrie in Nunnally Johnson's The World's Full of Girls, which was adapted from Thomas Bell's 1943 novel Till I Come Back to You. She was signed to a contract with MGM Studios under her professional name after Louis B. Mayer saw her performance.

Another Broadway role was in April-May 1944's Highland Fling.

Grahame made her film debut in Blonde Fever (1944) and then achieved one of her most widely praised roles as the flirtatious Violet Bick, saved from disgrace by George Bailey in It's a Wonderful Life (1946). MGM was not able to develop her potential as a star, and her contract was sold to RKO Studios in 1947.

She was often featured in film noir pictures as a tarnished beauty with an irresistible sexual allure. During this time, she made films for several Hollywood studios. She received an Oscar nomination for Best Supporting Actress for Crossfire (1947).

Grahame starred with Humphrey Bogart in the film In a Lonely Place (1950) for Columbia Pictures, a performance for which she gained praise. Though today it is considered among her finest performances, it was not a box-office hit, and Howard Hughes, owner of RKO, admitted that he never saw it. When she asked to be lent out for roles in Born Yesterday (also 1950) and A Place in the Sun (1951), Hughes refused and instead made her perform a supporting role in Macao (1952).

Despite only appearing for a little over nine minutes on screen, she won the Academy Award for Best Supporting Actress in MGM's The Bad and the Beautiful (also 1952); she long held the record for the shortest performance on screen to win an acting Oscar until Beatrice Straight won for Network with a five-minute performance.

Her other memorable roles included the scheming Irene Neves in Sudden Fear (also 1952), the femme fatale Vicki Buckley in Human Desire (1953), and mob moll Debby Marsh in Fritz Lang's The Big Heat (1953) in which, in a horrifying off-screen scene, she is scarred by hot coffee thrown in her face by Lee Marvin's character. Grahame appeared as wealthy seductress Harriet Lang in Stanley Kramer's Not as a Stranger (1955) starring Olivia de Havilland, Robert Mitchum, and Frank Sinatra. Grahame also did her own stunts as Angel the Elephant Girl in Cecil B. DeMille's The Greatest Show on Earth, which won the Oscar for best film of 1952.

Grahame's career began to wane after her performance in the musical film Oklahoma! (1955). She, whom audiences were used to seeing as a film noir siren, was viewed by some critics to be miscast as an ignorant country lass in a wholesome musical, and the paralysis of her upper lip from plastic surgery altered her speech and appearance. Additionally, she was rumored to have been difficult on the set of Oklahoma!, upstaging some of the cast and alienating her co-stars. She began a slow return to the theatre, returning to films occasionally to play supporting roles, mostly in minor releases.

She also guest-starred in television series, including the science-fiction series The Outer Limits. In the 1964 episode of that series titled "The Guests", Grahame plays a forgotten film star living in the past. She also appears in an episode of The Fugitive ("The Homecoming", 1964) and an episode of Burke's Law ("Who Killed The Rabbit's Husband", 1965). Grahame can be seen also in a 1970 episode of Mannix titled “Duet for Three” (Season 4 Episode 13) and in small roles in the miniseries Rich Man, Poor Man and Seventh Avenue.

The play The Time of Your Life was revived on March 17, 1972, at the Huntington Hartford Theater in Los Angeles with Grahame, Henry Fonda, Richard Dreyfuss, Lewis J. Stadlen, Ron Thompson, Jane Alexander, Richard X. Slattery, and Pepper Martin among the cast, and Edwin Sherin directing.

Personal life
Over time, Grahame became increasingly concerned with her physical appearance; she particularly felt her upper lip was too thin and had ridges that were too deep. She began stuffing cotton or tissues under it, which she felt gave her a sexier look. Several co-stars discovered this during kissing scenes. In the mid-1940s, Grahame began undergoing small cosmetic procedures on her lips and face. According to her niece, Vicky Mitchum, Grahame's obsession with vanity led her to undergo more cosmetic procedures that rendered her upper lip immobile because of nerve damage. Mitchum said, "Over the years, she [Grahame] carved herself up, trying to make herself into an image of beauty she felt should exist but didn't. Others saw her as a beautiful person, but she never did, and crazy things spread from that." 

Grahame was a Democrat who supported Adlai Stevenson's campaign in the 1952 presidential election.

Relationships, marriages, and children
Grahame was married four times and had four children. Her first marriage was to actor Stanley Clements in August 1945. They divorced in June 1948. The day after her divorce from Clements was made final, Grahame married director Nicholas Ray. They had a son, Timothy, in November 1948. After several separations and reconciliations, Grahame and Ray divorced in 1952. Grahame's third marriage was to writer and television producer Cy Howard. They married in August 1954 and had a daughter, Marianna Paulette in 1956. Grahame filed for divorce from Howard in May 1957, citing mental cruelty. Their divorce became final in November 1957.

Grahame's fourth and final marriage was to actor Anthony "Tony" Ray (b. 1937), the son of her second husband Nicholas Ray and his first wife Jean Evans; Anthony Ray was her former stepson. According to Nicholas Ray, their relationship reportedly began when Tony Ray was 13 years old and Grahame was still married to his father (Nicholas Ray allegedly caught the two in bed together, which he claimed effectively ended the marriage to Grahame in 1950.) However, Grahame's former partner and biographer, Peter Turner, has disputed this, saying that the story of Tony being underage when Grahame began her sexual relationship with him is "fiction". Grahame and Anthony Ray reconnected in 1958 and married in Tijuana, Mexico, in May, 1960. The couple went on to have two children: Anthony, Jr. (born 1963) and James (born 1965).

News of the marriage was kept private until 1962, when it was written about in the tabloids and the ensuing scandal damaged Grahame's reputation and affected her career. After learning of her marriage to Anthony Ray, Grahame's third husband, Cy Howard, attempted to gain sole custody of the couple's daughter, Marianna. Howard claimed Grahame was an unfit mother, and the two fought over custody of Marianna for years. The stress of the scandal, her waning career, and her custody battle with Howard took its toll on Grahame and she had a nervous breakdown. She later underwent electroshock therapy in 1964. Despite the surrounding scandal, Grahame's marriage to Anthony Ray was her only one, of four, to last well beyond four years (her marriage to his father lasted 4 years 2 months), as they did not divorce until a few days short of their 14th anniversary, in May 1974.

From 1979 to 1981, Grahame had a relationship with Peter Turner. Turner authored a book about his relationship with Grahame called Film Stars Don't Die in Liverpool, which was later turned into a movie with the same name.

Grahame had an affair with her leading man Glenn Ford during the filming of Human Desire in 1954.

Death
In March 1974, Grahame was diagnosed with breast cancer. She underwent radiation treatment, changed her diet, stopped smoking and drinking alcohol, and also sought homeopathic remedies. In less than a year, the cancer went into remission. The cancer returned in 1980, but Grahame refused to acknowledge her diagnosis or seek radiation treatment. Despite her failing health, Grahame continued working in stage productions in the United States and the United Kingdom. 

In the autumn of 1981, while performing at The Dukes in Lancaster, England, Grahame was taken ill. The local hospital wanted to perform surgery immediately, but she refused. Contacting her former lover, actor Peter Turner, she requested to live in Liverpool at the home of Turner's mother, where she would remain for six days. 

Grahame requested that Turner not contact doctors or her family, but Turner did so, for he was concerned about her health. According to Turner's book Film Stars Don't Die in Liverpool, his local family doctor told Grahame that she had a cancerous tumor in her abdomen "the size of a football." Breast cancer is not mentioned in the book.

Turner informed Grahame's children Timothy and Marianna of her illness, and they brought Grahame back to the U.S., against her wishes and those of her doctor and Turner, on October 5, 1981. She was immediately admitted to St. Vincent's Hospital in Manhattan, New York City, where she died a few hours later at the age of 57.

Grahame's remains were interred at Oakwood Memorial Park Cemetery in Chatsworth, Los Angeles. Grahame had kept an apartment at the Manhattan Plaza residential complex; and its community room, where her portrait hangs, is dedicated to her.

Legacy
For her contribution to the motion picture industry, Gloria Grahame has a star on the Hollywood Walk of Fame at 6522 Hollywood Boulevard.

The motion picture Film Stars Don't Die in Liverpool, based on Peter Turner's account of the final years of Grahame's life, was released in the United Kingdom on November 16, 2017, and in the United States on December 29, 2017. In the film, Grahame is portrayed by Annette Bening.

Filmography

Footnotes

Sources

Further reading
 Peter Turner, Film Stars Don't Die in Liverpool (New York: Grove Press, 1987)

External links

In Loving Memory Of Gloria Grahame
Gloria Grahame at Film Reference
 – Article by Donald Chase
Gloria Grahame at Virtual History

1923 births
1981 deaths
20th-century American actresses
20th-century American singers
20th-century American women singers
Actresses from Los Angeles
American film actresses
Methodists from California
American people of English descent
American stage actresses
American television actresses
Best Supporting Actress Academy Award winners
Burials at Oakwood Memorial Park Cemetery
Deaths from cancer in New York (state)
Deaths from breast cancer
Deaths from peritonitis
Hollywood High School alumni
Metro-Goldwyn-Mayer contract players
California Democrats
American people of Scottish descent